The 1944 Tipperary Senior Hurling Championship was the 54th staging of the Tipperary Senior Hurling Championship since its establishment by the Tipperary County Board in 1887.

Éire Óg Annacarty were the defending champions.

Thurles Sarsfields won the championship after a 6-03 to 1-04 defeat of Kilrunae MacDonaghs in the final. It was their 14th championship title overall and their first title since 1942.

References

Tipperary
Tipperary Senior Hurling Championship